Ompok bimaculatus, known as butter catfish, is a species of sheatfishes native to Asian countries such as Bangladesh, India, Pakistan, and Sri Lanka, but recently identified in Myanmar.

Known in Thailand as pla cha-on (ปลาชะโอน), it is one of the very similar catfish species known in the markets as pla nuea on (วงศ์ปลาเนื้ออ่อน). It is valued for its delicate flesh and is also used for making high-quality fish balls. Males can reach a length of 45 cm.

References

Siluridae
Freshwater fish of Sri Lanka
Fish of Southeast Asia
Fish described in 1794
Taxa named by Marcus Elieser Bloch